Soos or SOOS may refer to:

People

Surname
 Frank Soos, American short story writer
 Ricky Soos, English retired middle-distance runner
 Rozalia Șooș, Romanian former handballer

Places
 Soos, Iran, a village in Qazvin Province, Iran
 Sooß, a town in Austria

Fictional
 Soos Ramirez, a character in the animated series Gravity Falls

Mythological
 Soos (king of Sparta), a fictitious king of Sparta

Other uses
 SOOS, ICAO code for Saül Airport in French Guiana
 Southern Ocean Observing System (SOOS), an oceanographic initiative

See also
 Soós, a Hungarian surname